The 2020–21 Eerste Divisie, known as Keuken Kampioen Divisie for sponsorship reasons, was the sixty-fifth season of Eerste Divisie since its establishment in 1955.  It began on 28 August 2020, and came to an end on 12 May 2021.

Relegation for reserve teams 
On 1 August 2020, the KNVB detailed on its website in what scenarios the reserve teams in the league would have been relegated from the Eerste Divisie. However, on 24 February 2021, the KNVB eventually discontinued category A senior competitions in this season, including Tweede Divisie, thus no reserves would be relegated.

Relegation to the Tweede Divisie 
 No reserve team from the Eerste Divisie could have been relegated to the Tweede Divisie if the lowest classified reserves team in the Eerste Divisie was to be in the top 10.
 If the lowest classified reserve team in the Eerste Divisie finished between 11th through 18th and the highest classified reserve team in the Tweede Divisie finished first, the two teams were to play each other in a two-legged tie to decide which team would have played in the Eerste Divisie the next season and which team would have played in the Tweede Divisie.
 If the lowest classified reserves in the Eerste Divisie finished 19th or 20th and the highest classified reserves in the Tweede Divisie finished first or second, the lowest classified team from the Eerste Divisie was to be relegated to the Tweede Divisie while the highest classified reserves in the Tweede Divisie was to be promoted to the Eerste Divisie.
 If a reserve team played in the Eerste Divisie and the first team was to be relegated from the Eredivisie to the Eerste Divisie, the reserves were to be automatically relegated to the Tweede Divisie. In case this reserve team was to finish between first through third in the final ranking of reserves, the fourth-placed team would have not been relegated.

Teams 
A total of 20 teams are taking part in the league. On 24 April 2020, the 2019–20 season was cancelled due to the COVID-19 pandemic in the Netherlands. As a result, there was no promotion or relegation for the 2019–20 season, and the same teams are competing in the 2020–21 season.

Personnel and kits

Standings

Period tables

Period 1

Period 2

Period 3

Period 4

Fixtures/results

Statistics

Top scorers

References

2020–21
Netherlands
Eerste Divisie